Eustalomyia vittipes is a species of root-maggot fly in the family Anthomyiidae. It is found in Europe.

References

External links

 

Anthomyiidae
Articles created by Qbugbot
Insects described in 1845